Carol Zhao was the defending champion, but lost to Ivana Jorović in the quarterfinals.

Jorović went on to win the title, defeating Zheng Saisai in the final, 6–3, 2–6, 6–4.

Seeds

Draw

Finals

Top half

Bottom half

References
Main Draw

Shenzhen Longhua Open - Singles